This is a list of 580 species in the genus Platypalpus.

Platypalpus species

References

Platypalpus